"Crazy Love" is a song by the American rock band the Allman Brothers Band. It was the lead single from their sixth studio album, Enlightened Rogues (1979), released on Capricorn Records.

The song was their second-biggest hit on the Billboard Hot 100, peaking at number 29 in 1979.

Background
"Crazy Love" is "an uptempo rocker built around vigorous slide-guitar solos." It features background vocals from singer Bonnie Bramlett.

Reception
Cash Box said it has "winding guitar lines, muscular beat and rough and ready lead and backing vocals."

Charts

Notes

References

Sources

 
 

1979 songs
1979 singles
The Allman Brothers Band songs
Songs written by Dickey Betts
Song recordings produced by Tom Dowd
Capricorn Records singles